Two Million for a Smile (Italian: Due milioni per un sorriso) is a 1939 Italian "white-telephones" comedy film directed by Carlo Borghesio and Mario Soldati and starring Enrico Viarisio, Giuseppe Porelli and Elsa De Giorgi.

It was shot at the Palatino Studios in Rome. The film's sets were designed by the art director Gino Brosio.

Synopsis
An Italian industrialist who has made a fortune in America returns to Italy planning to make a film about a beautiful woman who smiled at him before he left his home country years before. With the assistance of a man who resembles his younger self he sets out to find the perfect woman for the role.

Cast

References

Bibliography 
  Roberto Curti. Riccardo Freda: The Life and Works of a Born Filmmaker. McFarland, 2017.

External links 
 

1939 films
Italian romance films
1930s romance films
1930s Italian-language films
Films directed by Carlo Borghesio
Films directed by Mario Soldati
Italian black-and-white films
Lux Film films
Films shot at Palatino Studios
1930s Italian films